The Temp may refer to:

 The Temp (film), a 1993 thriller film starring Timothy Hutton and Lara Flynn Boyle
 "The Temp", a 1999 Fairly OddParents short
 A nickname for the character Ryan Howard from the US television series The Office
 A nickname for the Canadian TV personality Rick Campanelli